Melanohalea peruviana is a species of foliose lichen in the family Parmeliaceae. Found in Peru, it was described as a new species in 2012 by Ted Essingler. Although it has a superficial similarity to Melanohalea trabeculata, it can be distinguished from that species by the presence of eight spores per ascus rather than 16–32, and by a more flattened and wrinkled thallus. Additionally, Melanohalea peruviana does not have detectable secondary compounds in the medulla, whereas M. trabeculata typically has medullary norstictic acid.

References

peruviana
Lichen species
Lichens described in 2012
Lichens of Peru